Tribalia or Triballia may refer to:

 The homeland of the Triballi, an ancient Thracian tribe that lived in modern Bulgaria, North Macedonia and Serbia
 An exonym formerly used for modern Serbia
 The Timok Valley, sometimes referred to as "Tribalia" in Romania